Candace Introcaso, CDP, Ph.D. is the President of La Roche College, a private Catholic institution in Pittsburgh, Pennsylvania.

Background
Sister Candace Introcaso was elected the seventh President of La Roche University by the Board of Trustees in 2004. As a member of the Sisters of Divine Providence, Introcaso began her involvement in higher education in the late 1980s, serving on both the faculty and the administrative staff at La Roche from 1986-91.

Introcaso went on to serve as assistant vice president for academic affairs at Heritage College, located in the Yakama Indian Reservation in Toppenish, Washington, from 1997 until 1999. Her next position was vice president for planning and assessment at Barry University in Miami, Florida.

Introcaso received her Ph.D in higher education administration from Claremont Graduate University, where she received the Hausam-Fisk Award for Excellence in Higher Education. Introcaso also holds an MA in sociology from Fordham University and a BA in psychology from Shippensburg University.

References

21st-century American Roman Catholic nuns
Fordham University alumni
Living people
Heads of universities and colleges in the United States
Year of birth missing (living people)
20th-century American Roman Catholic nuns
Women heads of universities and colleges